Vinathela is a genus of spiders in the family Liphistiidae. It was first described in 2000 by Ono. , it contains 7 species. Two species were formerly placed in the genus Nanthela, now submerged into Vinathela.

Species
Vinathela comprises the following species:
Vinathela abca (Ono, 1999) - Vietnam
Vinathela cucphuongensis (Ono, 1999) - Vietnam
Vinathela hongkong (Song & Wu, 1997) - Hong Kong
Vinathela hunanensis (Song & Haupt, 1984) - China
Vinathela nahang Logunov & Vahtera, 2017 - Vietnam
Vinathela tomokunii (Ono, 1997) - Vietnam
Vinathela tonkinensis (Bristowe, 1933) - Vietnam

References

Liphistiidae
Mesothelae genera
Spiders of Asia